Cheesy Home Video is the first home video from Primus, released in 1992 on VHS in conjunction with the band's first covers EP Miscellaneous Debris. The video includes three music videos interspersed with live footage filmed in the United States and Europe from the Roll the Bones tour, and interviews with the band at home and on Les Claypool's boat, hosted by Bob Cock.

In 2003, Cheesy Home Video was included on the Animals Should Not Try to Act Like People DVD, albeit edited down to exclude the music videos as they were already featured separately on the disc.

Track listing
Home Video Footage
"John the Fisherman" - Directed by Mark Kohr
Home Video Footage
"Jerry Was a Race Car Driver" - Directed by Mark Kohr
Home Video Footage
"Tommy the Cat" - Directed by Mark Kohr
Home Video Footage / Credits

Personnel
Les Claypool - bass, vocals
Larry LaLonde - guitar
Tim Alexander - drums

Critical reception

In his review for Allmusic, Greg Prato describes the video as "a brief yet wacky guided tour into the strange world of Primus." He contends that "it is a highly recommended vid," but also concludes that Cheesy Home Video could have been even better if full-length live songs were included."

References

Primus (band) video albums
1992 video albums